Dolhești is a commune located in Suceava County, Romania. It is composed of three villages: Dolheștii Mari (the commune center), Dolheștii Mici and Valea Bourei.

Natives
 Violeta Szekely

References

Communes in Suceava County
Localities in Western Moldavia